"It Takes a Muscle to Fall in Love" is the debut single by Dutch electronic band Spectral Display, released as a single in 1982 from their eponymous debut album. It was written by members Michel Mulders and Henri Overduin, and produced by Mulders.

M.I.A. version

British recording artist M.I.A. covered "It Takes a Muscle to Fall in Love" in 2010, titled "It Takes a Muscle". It is from her third studio album, Maya.

Production of M.I.A.'s version was handled by Diplo and incorporated reggae elements. The single was released worldwide as a digital download, under license to XL Recordings and N.E.E.T. Recordings, on 20 December 2010. Prior to the official release of the single, Diplo uploaded the song to his SoundCloud account on 26 October 2010. The song served as the sixth single from the album. After audience encouragement, M.I.A. performed "It Takes a Muscle" at Terminal 5, New York City in September and on British TV show Later... with Jools Holland in December 2010. The track received positive feedback from music critics.

Promo copies of the single announced that a music video for the song, directed by Spike Jonze, would be released. However, the video was never released and it is unknown whether it has ever been filmed.

Track listing
Digital download
 "It Takes a Muscle" – 3:03
 "It Takes a Muscle" (Pearson Sound Refix) – 5:53

Promo CD
 "It Takes a Muscle" (Radio Edit) – 2:38
 "It Takes a Muscle" (Original) – 3:00

12" single
 "It Takes a Muscle" (Pearson Sound Refix)

Release history

Other versions
In 2019, Australian musician Kirin J. Callinan covered the song for his covers album Return to Center.

References

1982 songs
1982 debut singles
2010 singles
Dutch new wave songs
Synth-pop songs
M.I.A. (rapper) songs
EMI Records singles
XL Recordings singles
N.E.E.T. Recordings singles
Interscope Records singles
Song recordings produced by Diplo